The Order of Michael the Brave is Romania's highest military decoration, instituted by King Ferdinand I during the early stages of the Romanian Campaign of the First World War, and was again awarded in the Second World War. The Order, which may be bestowed either on an individual or on a whole unit, was named in honor of Michael the Brave (Mihai Viteazul), the late 16th-century Prince of Wallachia, Transylvania, and Moldavia.

Data
 Requirements: Awarded to officers only for exceptional deeds on the battlefield. It is the highest ranking Romanian military order.
 Classes: 3rd, 2nd and 1st
 Date Instituted: September 26, 1916
 Number awarded: 2184
 During WW1:
 1st class: 16
 2nd class: 12
 3rd class: 336 (of which 43 awarded to military units)
 During WW2:
 1st class: 15
 2nd class: 76 (of which 13 awarded to military units)
 3rd class: 1628 (of which 118 awarded to military units)

Recipients

Józef Piłsudski
Ion Antonescu
Josip Broz Tito
Vasile Atanasiu
Alexandru Averescu
Radu Bâldescu
Nicolae Dabija
Corneliu Dragalina
Grigore Gafencu
Eremia Grigorescu
Douglas Haig
Michael I of Romania (as Commander-in-Chief of the Romanian Army in 1941)
John J. Pershing
Radu Korne
Mihail Lascăr
Leonard Mociulschi
Ioan Pălăghiţă
Constantin Prezan
Corneliu Teodorini
Constantin Mihalcea
Gheorghe Băgulescu
Virgil Bădulescu

During the Second World War, while Romania was allied with Germany, the Order was awarded to several military members of other Axis Powers, many in the Wehrmacht:

Erwin Rommel
Theodor Busse
Fedor von Bock
Walther von Brauchitsch
Dietrich von Choltitz
Karl Dönitz
Hermann Göring
Hermann Hoth
Carl Gustaf Emil Mannerheim
Erich von Manstein
Friedrich Paulus
Wolfram von Richthofen
Gerd von Rundstedt
Wilhelm Schöning
Walter Warlimont
Paul Ludwig Ewald von Kleist
Helmuth von Pannwitz
Erwin Jaenecke

See also
List of military decorations
List of Romanian decorations

References

External links 
  Order of Michael the Brave at worldwar2.ro
  History of the Order at the Romanian Presidency site
  Order of Michael the Brave and its recipients at TracesOfWar.com

Romanian decorations
Awards established in 1916
Cross symbols
Military awards and decorations of Romania
Michael the Brave